The Holy Forty Martyrs of Sebastia Cathedral is a cathedral located in the Old City of Homs, Syria, dedicated to the Forty Martyrs of Sebaste. It is the official see of the Greek Orthodox Archbishop of Homs and Dependencies.

A "beautiful church dedicated to the Forty Martyrs" standing in Homs was already mentioned by Joos van Ghistele in the 15th century.

By 1914, "a large bell" had been sent from Russia for this church.

References

Churches in Syria
Religious buildings and structures in Homs
Eastern Orthodox church buildings in Syria
Greek Orthodox Church of Antioch